7-Methylguanosine (m7G) is a modified purine nucleoside.  It is a methylated version of guanosine and when found in human urine, it may be a biomarker of some types of cancer. In the RNAs, 7-methylguanosine have been used to study and examine the reaction evolving methylguanosine.  It also plays a role in mRNA as a blocking group at its 5´-end.

See also
METTL1
23S rRNA (guanine2445-N2)-methyltransferase
16S rRNA (guanine527-N7)-methyltransferase

References

External links
 Metabocard for 7-Methylguanosine (HMDB01107), Human Metabolome Database, University of Alberta

Nucleosides
Purines
Hydroxymethyl compounds
Biomarkers